Kimberley Chongyon Motley is an American international human rights and civil rights lawyer. She is an attorney, author, entrepreneur, and former Mrs. Wisconsin-America 2004. Motley is the first foreign attorney to practice in Afghanistan since 2008 .  

While Motley's international human rights work began in Afghanistan, she now represents clients in other countries as well.  Her clients include Anwar Ibrahim, the former deputy prime minister of Malaysia, Matthew Rosenberg New York Times Journalist in his expulsion from Afghanistan, Niloofar Rahmani Afghanistan's first female pilot, and Cuban artist Danilo Maldonado Machado where Motley was arrested for representing him.

In 2014, Motley was named by Richard Branson, who she has also done some legal work for, as one of the most inspirational people and described her as "an inspiring litigator with a powerful message: 'The laws are ours – no matter your ethnicity, nationality, gender, race – they belong to us.'"

In the male-dominated Afghan court and prison system, wrote Tom Freston in Vanity Fair, Motley "must appear to be someone from outer space. She acknowledges this but declares that she gets respect... She has proven to be a very effective and tenacious fighter." Motley has been described as possessing "a rare kind of grit—the kind necessary to hang a shingle in Kabul, represent the under-represented, weather a kaleidoscope of threats, and win the respect of the Afghan legal establishment (and of tribal leaders)."

Tom Rosenstock, an attorney who has worked in Kabul since 2008, told The Daily Beast that Motley may be doing more "to promote rule of law than large ambitious programs which never get to where the rubber meets the road."

Motley spoke about her legal philosophy in her TED Talk which has garnered over a million views. She has spoken at Google about corporations and individuals responsibility to promote human rights by becoming "global investors in human rights."  In addition to this, Motley was featured on BBC's Desert Island Discs program.

Early life and education 
Motley's father is African-American and her mother is from rural North Korea. Her parents met when her father was in the military. Motley was raised in a "hard" neighborhood in Milwaukee. She became interested in law after a teacher assigned Law & Order for class and after witnessing her father's legal fight for disability after being laid off after a car accident.

Motley received an Associate of Arts and Sciences (A.A.S.) degree from Milwaukee Area Technical College in 1997. She received a B.A. degree from the University of Wisconsin–Milwaukee in 2000, and in 2003 received an M.A. from the same institution. In the same year, she earned a J.D. from Marquette University Law School.

In 2004, Motley was crowned Miss Wisconsin.

Career 
In 2008, after working as a public defender in Milwaukee for five years, Motley went to Afghanistan as part of a nine-month legal education program run by the U.S. State Department to train Afghan lawyers. She had never traveled outside the U.S. before. "In that nine months," she later recalled in a 2014 TED talk, "I went around the country and I talked to hundreds of people that were locked up, and I talked to many businesses that were also operating in Afghanistan. And within these conversations, I started hearing the connections between the businesses and the people, and how laws that were meant to protect them were being underused, while gross and illegal punitive measures were overused. And so this put me on a quest for justness, and what justness means to me is using laws for their intended purpose, which is to protect. The role of laws is to protect. So as a result, I decided to open up a private practice, and I became the first foreigner to litigate in Afghan courts."

At first she represented Westerners in Afghan prisons without legal representation. "What I found," she later recalled, "is that most did not have proper legal representation. If they were English-speaking, they had no idea what was going on in court. I felt and still feel a great responsibility for them as a person and as a lawyer."

Motley's first defendant was "an African woman convicted of drug trafficking. She was a drug mule sent to Afghanistan by a European pimp....She had been in prison for two years with her then-3-year-old daughter. She was convicted of 14 years in prison, so her child would have grown up in jail. She had gone through almost all of her legal options. I felt very helpless, and I do believe her case helped define and shape who I am. She was not afforded her due process under Afghan law. She and her child were tucked away in an Afghan prison, forgotten." Eventually Motley was able to secure a presidential decree ordering the woman's release.

Since 2009, Motley has been the CEO of Motley Consulting International, of which she is a Founding Partner. Since the same year she has also been CEO of Motley Legal Services, which provides legal representation in the U.S. and Afghanistan. She spends approximately six months in a fortified house in Kabul, where she provides representation for criminal and human-rights cases in the nation. She is preoccupied with the task of growing the capacity of rule of law internationally. She is registered as an attorney with the American, French, U.A.E., Australian, Spanish, Dutch, British, Italian, Norwegian, German, and Canadian Embassies in Afghanistan, and is thus routinely contacted by expatriates who are facing legal troubles with Afghan authorities.

The Daily Beast in 2010, "and often her work starts after the verdict—as in the case of an Australian on death row, convicted of murdering an Afghan colleague; a South African sentenced to fifteen years in prison on drug charges, and a Brit convicted of fraud." For example, "she negotiated the release of Bill Shaw, a former British military officer, who had been held in the notorious Pul-e-charki prison for five months."

She "has developed her own approach to operating in the Afghan courts," reported The Daily Beast. For example, "she never wears a veil or a dress" during a trial. She explained, "I need to look like a man as much as possible...I find that men hear me more when I don't wear a headscarf. I wore it at first, and when I took it off, I found men were more respectful."

As of 2010, Motley was under a threat from the Afghan District Attorney's office to arrest her next time she set foot in Kabul, as retribution for her harsh criticism of Afghanistan's corrupt judicial system. She had no hesitation about returning. She also noted that she received death threats and rape threats. She has also "been temporarily detained" and "accused of running a brothel" and of espionage. A grenade was thrown at her office. But she has said that the rewards of her job "far outweigh the risks, and as many risks as I take, my clients take far greater risks, because they have a lot more to lose if their cases go unheard, or worse, if they're penalized for having me as their lawyer. With every case that I take, I realize that as much as I'm standing behind my clients, that they're also standing behind me, and that's what keeps me going."

On June 21, 2014, Motley's husband, Claudiare Motley, was shot in Milwaukee after attending a high school reunion due to an attempted carjacking committed by Nathan King a sixteen year old.  Eventually King was shot while attempting another robbery and became paralyzed as a result.  Motley represented Claudiare and Victoria Davison, the woman who shot King, in Court.  On July 16, 2015, King was found guilty of the two counts of Attempted Armed Robbery against Motley and Davison and ultimately received twelve years in prison and eight years extended supervision prison sentence.

On December 16, 2016, Motley went to Havana, Cuba to represent Danilo Machado.  While in Havana, Motley was arrested without charge and subsequently deported from Cuba.  On January 21, 2017, Machado was released from El Combinado del Este prison without charge.

Clients 
Motley's clients have included but are not limited to:
 Fatou - Kuwait moves on Instagram Slave Traders After BBC Investigation
 Eritrean Soccer Players who Defected Said They Live in Fear
 Ablikim Yusuf - Activist Scramble to Prevent Uighur Man's Deportation to China
 Danilo Maldonado Machado a.k.a. El Sexto - Human Rights Attorney Representing El Sexto Arrested in Havana
 Niloofar Rhamani - Meet Afghanistan's First Female Fixed Wing Pilot
 Anwar Ibrahim - U.S. Lawyer takes on Anwar Ibrahim's Sodomy II Case
 Australian Child Abduction - Children Abducted to Afghanistan Returned to their Mother
 British Child Abduction - Snatched Boys Found in Afghanistan Reunited with Mother
 Bevan Campbell - Former Beauty Queen on Lawyering in Afghanistan (Bevan Campbell Freed)
 Victoria Davidson - Two Crime Victims One a CCW Holder who Shot Boy in Court for Sixteen Year Old's Sentencing
 Farkhunda - (Motley Represented Farkhunda's family only in First Court in which there were 23 convictions) Hardly Justice for Farkhunda
 David Gordon - U.S. Contractor Illegally Detained in Afghanistan
 Sahar Gul - Afghanistan's Hunted Women Update
 Gulnaz - Afghan Rape Victim Freed From Jail
 Michael Hearn - British Private Security Company Employee Jailed by Afghans Amid Crackdown (freed from jail)
 Khatera - Afghan Sues Police Over Daughter's Murder
 Robert Langdon - Freed Aussie's Debt to U.S. Lawyer
 Anthony Malone - Ex-para Anthony Malone Freed from Afghan Jail
 Naghma (Child Bride) - Brokering A Deal to Save a Child Bride
 Mariam Rocabado - A World Class Lawyer Deals with a Case of Rape in Bolivia
 Matthew Rosenberg / New York Times - New President Welcomes Back Times Reporter
 William Shaw - Former British Army Officer Acquitted of Bribery Charge
 Baljit Singh - Afghan Man, Detained for Being Sikh is Released from Prison
 Charlie Tate - Two Men Sentenced in Unrelated Deaths
 Philip Young - Philip Young to be Released
 British Contractors - Britons Freed in Afghanistan After Weapons Arrest
 Eight-Year-Old Boy Must Stay in Supervised Care

Motley's Law (documentary film) 
A documentary film entitled Motley's Law about Motley made by the Danish film production company Made in Copenhagen and directed by Nicole Nielsen Horanyi and produced by Helle Faber was released in October 2015.  It won the Grand Jury Prize Award at NYC DOC 2015.

It also won the AWFJ - Alliance of Women Film Journalists' EDA Award for Best Female-Directed Documentary at IDFA 2015.  Motley's Law was nominated for the FACT Award at CPH-DOX.

The film has been described as being "Fascinating." Motley has been described as "fearless, but she's also endearing; she's not an abrasive personality or a crusading egocentric as one might expect from a person who puts herself in harm's way in a land to which she has no personal attachment." A "Bad Ass Lawyer Fighting for Justice in Afghanistan."

Other activities
In addition to practicing law, Motley has taught spinning classes at the military bases while in Kabul. "I respect the military," she has said.

In December 2014, she gave a TED talk entitled "How can we all find ways to be courageous?" She described cases she has handled that illustrate "how a country's own laws can bring both justice and 'justness.'" She also gave a talk at the Oslo Freedom Forum in May 2015.

In her TED talk, Motley is noted as saying that "the reason for my success is very simple: I work the system from the inside out and use the laws in the ways that they're intended to be used." Motley also popularized the term "Justness", which she defines as using the laws for their intended purpose which is to protect. She recently is working on the Justness Project which is a global campaign to "put laws back in the hands of the people."

Motley also has talked about Building A Global Human Rights Economy.

Publications

Books and reports
 Lawless: A lawyer's unrelenting fight for justice in a war zone (Allen & Unwin, 2019), hardback ; paperback Lawless: A Lawyer's Unrelenting Fight for Justice in One of the World's Most Dangerous Places 
“Juvenile Justice Sentencing Guidelines for Afghanistan,” Italian Cooperation, 2nd Edition, May 2017.

“Juvenile Justice Sentencing Guidelines for Afghanistan,” Italian Cooperation, 1st Edition, May 2013.

“Assessment of Juvenile Justice in Afghanistan”, Terre des Hommes, 2010.

Articles
"Failing Farkhunda Means Failing Afghan Women"
"The Mob Killing of Farkhunda was a Defining Moment for Women's Rights in Afghanistan"
"A Defining Moment"
"Our Complacency with War Torn Violence"
"The Immorality of Afghanistan's Moral Crimes"
"Article 26: The implications for Afghanistani women and children," published by Chambers and Partners, Chambers Women & Diversity in February 2014.
"Making Good on the 911 Legacy for Afghan Women"
"Juvenile Injustice in Afghanistan"
"Assessment of Juvenile Justice in Afghanistan"

References

Year of birth missing (living people)
Living people
Lawyers from Milwaukee
Marquette University alumni
Marquette University Law School alumni
Milwaukee Area Technical College alumni
University of Wisconsin–Milwaukee alumni
Afghan lawyers
Wisconsin lawyers
International law
21st-century American women judges
21st-century American judges
American people of Korean descent